Laurionite (PbCl(OH)) is a lead halide mineral. It forms colorless to white crystals in the orthorhombic crystal system and is dimorphous with paralaurionite, both members of the matlockite group. 

It was first described in 1887 for an occurrence in the Laurium District, Attica, Greece, and named after the town Laurium.
It occurs as an oxidation product in lead ore deposits, and is also produced on lead-bearing slag by reaction with saline solutions.  It occurs associated with paralaurionite, penfieldite, fiedlerite, phosgenite, cerussite and anglesite.

References

Halide minerals
Orthorhombic minerals
Minerals in space group 62
Lead minerals